The 2016 Kansas State Wildcats football team represented Kansas State University in the 2016 NCAA Division I FBS football season. The Wildcats played their home games at Bill Snyder Family Football Stadium, in Manhattan, Kansas as they have since 1968. The Wildcats were led by head coach Bill Snyder in his 25th overall and eighth straight season since taking over for his second tenure in 2009. 2016 was the 121st season in school history. K-State was a member of the Big 12 Conference. Kansas State won the Texas Bowl against former Big 12 opponent, Texas A&M.

Previous season
The 2015 Kansas State Wildcats football team finished the regular season 6–7 and played against Arkansas in the Liberty Bowl, which they lost 23–45.

Schedule

Game summaries

at Stanford

Florida Atlantic

Missouri State

Game was called off at the halftime due to weather.

at West Virginia

Texas Tech

at Oklahoma

Texas

at Iowa State

Oklahoma State

at Baylor

Kansas

at TCU

vs. Texas A&M

References

Kansas State
Kansas State Wildcats football seasons
Texas Bowl champion seasons
Kansas State Wildcats football